The Nikon 1 S2 is a digital mirrorless interchangeable lens camera announced by Nikon on May 14, 2014.

See also
 Nikon 1 series
 Nikon 1-mount

References
http://www.dpreview.com/products/nikon/slrs/nikon_s2/specifications

Nikon MILC cameras
S2
Cameras introduced in 2014